The women's 800 metres at the 2021 World Athletics U20 Championships was held at the Kasarani Stadium from 19 to 21 August.

Records

Results

Heats
Qualification: First 3 of each heat (Q) and the 4 fastest times (q) qualified for the semifinals.

Semifinals
Qualification: First 3 of each heat (Q) and the 2 fastest times (q) qualified for the final.

Final
The final was held on 21 August at 16:46.

References

800 metres
800 metres at the World Athletics U20 Championships
U20